Pedro Monteiro may refer to:
Pedro Monteiro (swimmer) (born 1975), Brazilian swimmer
Pedro Monteiro (footballer) (born 1994), Portuguese footballer